The First Lady of Nicaragua (Spanish: Primera dama de Nicaragua) is the title attributed to the wife of the President of Nicaragua, or their chosen designee, such as a daughter or other relative. The current incumbent first lady is Rosario Murillo, wife of President Daniel Ortega, who controversially became Vice President of Nicaragua under Ortega in January 2017.

Recent history
The daughters of several presidents have assumed the role of first lady or acting first lady in recent decades. From 1990 until 1997, the government of President Violeta Chamorro, Nicaragua's first female president, designated her daughter, Cristiana Chamorro Barrios, in the role of first lady. Violeta Chamorro's husband, Pedro Joaquín Chamorro Cardenal, had been murdered in 1978 before she became president.

Likewise, former President Arnoldo Alemán was a widower and unmarried when he was inaugurated in January 1997. His daughter, María Dolores Alemán Cardinel, served as First Lady of Nicaragua from January 1997 until October 1999 under her father. In October 1999, President Alemán married María Fernanda Flores Lanzas, who assumed the role of first lady.

The incumbent first lady is Rosario Murillo, wife of President Daniel Ortega, who was held the position since 2007. Murillo had previously served as first lady during the 1980s as Ortega's domestic partner in a common-law marriage. The couple later officially married in 2005. During the 2016 Nicaraguan general election, President Ortega controversially selected his wife as his running mate for Vice President of Nicaragua, the second highest political position in Nicaragua. Murillo became Vice President in January 2017, simultaneously serving as first lady. She is "widely seen as the power behind the presidency" according to Lucia Newman, a journalist with Al Jazeera English and a veteran journalist on Latin America. In 2021, Ortega, who was seeking a fourth consecutive term, and Murillo were re-elected during an election marred by the arrest and detention of numerous political opponents of the Ortega government, including  Cristiana Chamorro Barrios and María Fernanda Flores Lanzas, the former first lady from 1999 to 2002. Murillo was sanctioned by the European Union for human rights violations and undermining Nicaraguan democracy during the election, while the Biden administration banned Murillo and other officials from entering the United States.

Partial list of first ladies

References

 
Nicaragua
Nicaraguan women in politics